Weilbach A/S, formerly Iver C. Weilbach & Co., is a provider of software solutions, nautical charts and publications for the shipping industry. It is headquartered at Firskovvej 36, Lyngby in Copenhagen, Denmark, and has subsidiaries in Singapore and Canada, with three offices in Egypt - Port Said, Alexandria and Suez. Dating from 1755, Weilbach A/S is among the oldest, existing maritime supplier companies in the world.

History 

The foundations of the company were laid on November 24, 1755, when flag, sail and compass maker Iver Jensen Borger set up his own maritime supplier business in Copenhagen, Denmark. Iver Jensen Borger specialized in the production of nautical instruments, mainly magnetic compasses, as well as flags and sails for sailing vessels. He gradually expanded the business into one of the main maritime suppliers in Copenhagen and laid the basis of a long-lasting family firm. 

When Borger died in 1799, his son-in-law, Johan Philip Weilbach, took over the business and during the nineteenth century it passed to subsequent generations of the Weilbach family.

During the nineteenth century steam ships and iron-hulled vessels started to replace wooden sailing vessels, and technological changes in shipping provided new business opportunities for Weilbach. Magnetic compasses were sensitive to the magnetic fields of iron and steel hulls and needed regular corrections by professional compass correctors. Such corrections were done during sea trials for new vessels, but they were also performed on regular intervals on existing vessels. Weilbach's employees specialized in this activity as a supplement to the making of nautical instruments.

 
In 1887, Weilbach's business was split between two brothers, Iver Christian Weilbach and Johannes Sophus Vilhelm Weilbach. The former took over the compass and nautical instrument business, and the latter got the flag and sail business. J.S.V. Weilbach's flag and sail making activities continued into the twentieth century, but the decline of the sailing fleet after 1900 caused the business to contract. J.S.V. Weilbach responded to the technological changes in shipping by shifting business focus from production of marine sails to tarpaulin and tents, thus diversifying the product range by using existing know how in new ways.

Iver C. Weilbach continued the production of nautical instruments, and the company proved viable in the long term. In fact it still bears his name. In the interwar period Iver C. Weilbach's company set up two new business areas that gradually developed into the main activities. It entered the field of maritime publishing and started to provide sea charts for Danish merchant and fishing vessels. In 1921 Weilbach published the Nautical Almanac (“Nautisk Almanak”), which came out annually and contained navigational and meteorological information. In 1929 it added another year book, The Fishery Yearbook (“Fiskeriårbogen”), which contained useful information for Danish fishermen. Iver C. Weilbach & Co. A/S continues to publish the latter at present.

In 1931, Weilbach entered into an agreement with the United Kingdom Hydrographic Office, the main global producer of nautical charts. Weilbach gained a Danish agency for the Hydrographic Office's nautical charts, which allowed it to expand its product range and its services on offer to Danish shipping companies. Until the 1950s, Weilbach competed with another nautical chart supplier in the Danish market, but since the late 1950s it has served as the main supplier of nautical charts to Danish shipping companies.

Iver C. Weilbach did not have sons or daughters and in 1908 he promoted Captain Knud Prahl to partner in the company. Prahl had a background as master mariner, and this was the first time a non-family member became part of the company management. Gradually Iver C. Weilbach withdrew from daily management in the company and he died in 1921. In 1916 Captain Carl V. Sølver was made co-partner with Knud Prahl in the company, and upon Prahl's death in 1928 yet another master mariner, Anker Svarrer, was made co-partner. The company was owned by subsequent managers, all of whom had served as master mariners early on in the careers. In 1961 a holding company, the foundation of Iver. C. Weilbach & Co. A/S's Legatfond, was established and it has served as the sole owner of the company since 2005.

With the advent of electronic navigation in the twentieth century, magnetic compasses gradually lost ground to gyro compasses and global positioning systems. Iver C. Weilbach & Co. A/S never engaged in the production of electronic navigational systems, which was mainly based on know-how developed in the military industry. The company however continued to produce magnetic compasses until 2009-10 and employees of the company performed compass correction until the 1990s.

In the 1960s and 1970s the nautical chart supplies and the maritime publishing developed into the main activities of the company. New international, maritime regulation on maritime safety and marine environmental protection caused the maritime publishing market to expand after 1970 and Iver C. Weilbach & Co. A/S proved able to supply updated maritime hand books for onboard libraries in the Danish merchant fleet.

In the twenty-first century, new technological developments in shipping have again started to change the nature of Iver C. Weilbach & Co.’s business. The advent of electronic nautical charts and electronic publishing of maritime hand books has provided a new business opportunity for Iver C. Weilbach & Co. A/S, and the company has expanded its services in this field since 2005. It now offers both printed and electronic nautical charts and hand books for onboard libraries and it is able to offer services and updates to the shipping companies on a 24-7 basis. A subsidiary in Singapore was set up in 2010.

References 

René Taudal Poulsen, 2009. ’I Nellebladets kølvand... Historien om Weilbach og Det blå Danmark’, Iver C. Weilbach & Co. A/S, Copenhagen.

External links 
 Weilbach.com The official web site for Weilbach A/S.

Maritime books
Danish companies established in 1755
Mass media companies of Denmark
Manufacturing companies based in Copenhagen
Mass media companies based in Copenhagen
Companies based in Lyngby-Taarbæk Municipality